The 2007 ARFU Asian Rugby Series was the fourth edition of a tournament created by Asian Rugby Football Union for national teams. In 2008, it was replaced by the Asian Five Nations.

Tournaments

First Division  

Ranking : 
 1.   (admitted to 2008 Asian Five Nations) 
 2.   (admitted to 2008 Asian Five Nations) 
 3.   (admitted to 2008 Asian Five Nations)

Second division  

Ranking : 
 1.   (admitted to 2008 Asian Five Nations) 
 2. Arabian Gulf  (admitted to 2008 Asian Five Nations) 
 3.    (admitted to division 1 of 2008 Asian Five Nations)

Third division 

Ranking : 
 1.   (admitted to division 1 of 2008 Asian Five Nations) 
 2.   (admitted to division 1 of 2008 Asian Five Nations) 
 3.   (admitted to division 2 of 2008 Asian Five Nations)

Fourth Division 

Ranking : 
 1.   (admitted to division 1 of 2008 Asian Five Nations) 
 2.   (admitted to division 2 of 2008 Asian Five Nations) 
 3.   (admitted to division 2 of 2008 Asian Five Nations)

Fifth Division 

 1.   (admitted to division 2 of 2008 Asian Five Nations) 
 2.   (admitted to regional tournament of 2008 Asian Five Nations) 
 3.   (admitted to regional tournament of 2008 Asian Five Nations)

Division 6 (Borneo Cup) 

Ranking:
 1.  
 2.  
 3.  
 4. 

2007
2007 rugby union tournaments for national teams
2007 in Asian rugby union